Orbis  may refer to:

Companies
 Orbis Business Intelligence, a British private intelligence firm
 Orbis Technology, a British bookmaker software company now called OpenBet
 Orbis (Polish travel agency), a Polish travel agency, established in 1920

Entertainment
 Orbis (audio drama), a Doctor Who audio play
 Orbis Pictus (film), a 1997 Slovak film

Historical
 The "Orbis Terrarum", a map of the world created by Marcus Vipsanius Agrippa in 20 A.D.
 Orbis, Rhineland-Palatinate, a municipality in the Donnersbergkreis district, in Rhineland-Palatinate, Germany
 Orbis Pictus, a 1658 children's book by Czech educator Jan Ámos Komenský

Publishing
 Orbis Books, a U.S. publishing imprint of the Maryknoll order
 Orbis Publishing, a British publisher of partworks and books
 Orbis Pictus Award, awarded by the National Council of Teachers of English for outstanding children's nonfiction literature
 Orbis, a 2002 alternative history novel by Scott Mackay

Periodicals
 Orbis (journal), a quarterly journal of international affairs published by the Foreign Policy Research Institute
 Orbis Litterarum, a bimonthly literary journal published by Wiley-Blackwell
 Vanderbilt Orbis, a progressive student newspaper at Vanderbilt University in Nashville, Tennessee

Other uses
 Orbis Cascade Alliance, an academic library consortia in the U.S. states of Washington, Oregon and Idaho
 Orbis International (the "Flying Eye Hospital"), a charitable organization devoted to treating and preventing blindness
 a development kit for PlayStation 4
 Orbis OS, the proprietary operating system used by PlayStation 4
 Orbiting Binary Black Hole Investigation Satellite (ORBIS), a space telescope in development by Japan
 ORBIS: The Stanford Geospatial Network Model of the Roman World, an interactive site co-developed by Walter Scheidel
 a company database provided by Bureau van Dijk

See also
 
 Orb (disambiguation)
 Orbiso, a village in Montaña Alavesa, Spain
 Orbit (disambiguation)